Toby Lynn (born 6 October 1984) is a New Zealand rugby union footballer. His regular playing position is lock. He represented the Western Force in Super Rugby until 2013. He previously played for the Chiefs and made his franchise debut during the 2007 Super 14 season against the Brumbies.

External links 
Western Force profile
Waikato profile
itsrugby.co.uk profile

Living people
1984 births
New Zealand rugby union players
Rugby union players from Hamilton, New Zealand
Rugby union locks
Western Force players
Chiefs (rugby union) players
Waikato rugby union players
New Zealand expatriate rugby union players
Expatriate rugby union players in Australia
New Zealand expatriate sportspeople in Australia